Gholamreza Fath-Abadi is an Iranian football forward who played for Iran in the 1984 Asian Cup. He played for both clubs Esteghlal and Persepolis.

International Records

Honours

Asian Cup:
Fourth Place : 1984

External links
Team Melli Stats

Living people
Iranian footballers
Iran international footballers
rah Ahan players
Esteghlal F.C. players
Persepolis F.C. players
1980 AFC Asian Cup players
1984 AFC Asian Cup players
Association football forwards
Footballers at the 1986 Asian Games
Place of birth missing (living people)
Asian Games competitors for Iran
1957 births